Sheikh Alamgir Kabir Rana (born 7 June 1990) is a Bangladeshi footballer who plays as a midfielder. He currently plays for Dhaka Mohammedan a team of Bangladesh Premier League.

References

Living people
1990 births
Place of birth missing (living people)
Bangladeshi footballers
Bangladesh international footballers
Sheikh Jamal Dhanmondi Club players
Association football midfielders
Bashundhara Kings players
Muktijoddha Sangsad KC players
Sheikh Russel KC players
Mohammedan SC (Dhaka) players